The Seattle Kraken are a professional ice hockey team based in Seattle. They play in the Pacific Division of the Western Conference in the National Hockey League (NHL). They have played at Climate Pledge Arena since their inaugural season in 2021–22. The Kraken joined the NHL as an expansion team in 2021. The team's first head coach, Dave Hakstol, was hired on June 24, 2021.

Key

Coaches
Note: Statistics are updated through the 2021–22 season.

Notes

References

Seattle Kraken head coaches
Seattle Kraken personnel
head coaches